is a subway station in Bunkyō, Tokyo, Japan, operated by Tokyo Metro. Its station number is Y-12. The station opened on 30 October 1974.

Lines
Edogawabashi Station is served by the Tokyo Metro Yūrakuchō Line.

Station layout
The station, which is underground, consists of an island platform and two tracks. There is an elevator between the ticket gate level and the platform level. The toilets are on the first underground floor, outside the ticket gates. In 2005, a multi-function toilet, including facilities for infant care and the physically disabled were installed.

In 2005, the outer walls of the platform area were repaired, and the running in board was changed to a larger, rectangular shape. The outer walls were also given a unique, decorative design.

Because the station is located on an s-shaped bend in the track, two watchmen, part of the station staff, are needed.

Surrounding area
Edogawabashi Station is the nearest station to the St Mary's Tokyo Cathedral.

Stations of Tokyo Metro
Tokyo Metro Yurakucho Line
Railway stations in Tokyo
Railway stations in Japan opened in 1974